The Ashburner family is an English gentry family whose members were prominent as merchants and administrators in British-ruled India during the 18th and 19th centuries, especially during Company rule in India (1757–1858). The family's history is closely linked to the British East India Company and their activities in the Bombay (Mumbai) area.

William Ashburner (1737–1793), originally from Dalton-in-Furness, established the family in India, and was in charge of the East India Company's factory in Tellicherry before he moved to the same position in Bombay. His son Luke Ashburner (1772–1844) became the head of the Bombay Presidency. His granddaughter Sarah married William Erasmus Darwin, the son of Charles Darwin. George Ashburner (1810–1869), a son of Luke Ashburner, bought the estate Tilgate House in Crawley; his only daughter Sarah married banker John Hennings Nix, and among their descendants were Alexander Nix, whose full name is Ashburner Nix. A daughter of William Ashburner, Grace Ashburner (1774–1812), married the son of Thomas Boddington.

References

British East India Company people
English gentry families